Vickie M. Mays is an American psychologist known for her research on racial disparities in health. She is a professor in the Department of Psychology in the College of Letters and Sciences and a professor in the Department of Health Services, both at the University of California, Los Angeles (UCLA). She is also the director of the BRITE Center for Science, Research and Policy at UCLA. In 2007, she received the Award for Distinguished Contributions to Research in Public Policy from the American Psychological Association, and in 2020, she received the Carl Taube Award for Lifetime Contributions to the Field of Mental Health from the American Public Health Association's Mental Health Section. In 2021, she received a President's Citation from the American Psychological Association.

References

External links
Faculty page

Living people
American women psychologists
African-American psychologists
Academics from Chicago
University of California, Los Angeles faculty
Loyola University Chicago alumni
University of Massachusetts Amherst alumni
Year of birth missing (living people)